Gnangara is a suburb of Perth, Western Australia, located within the City of Wanneroo. Gnangara is also the name for an underground water mound with a 117-hectare surface feature called Lake Gnangara.

Facilities
Much of the suburb's area is semi rural, with residential estate developed in the early 1990s by Midland Brick and centred on Lakelands Drive borders includes the private 18-hole golf course Lakelands Country Club, established in 1984 on 70 hectares. The Perth International Telecommunications Centre is located near and often associated with Gnangara.

Location
Gnangara is bounded by Ocean Reef Road and Gnangara Road to the south, Badgerup Road and Ross Road to the west and the Gnangara Pine Plantation to the northeast and east. While the plantation is named for the suburb, only a few hectares of it are within the suburb's boundaries, with the majority in Lexia to the east.

Education
Gnangara contained the Aboriginal Community College (K-12), founded in 1979 and closed in 2008. It was one of two independent Indigenous schools in the metropolitan area.

References

Suburbs of Perth, Western Australia
Suburbs of the City of Wanneroo
Noongar placenames